Midwest Studies in Philosophy is an annual journal in the analytic tradition. It was established in 1976 by Peter French, Theodore Uehling, Jr., and Howard Wettstein at the University of Minnesota, and has been published without interruption since that time. Each volume is an anthology of invited contributions on a particular topic. The journal was published by Wiley from 1999-2019 with a SHERPA/RoMEO "yellow" self-archiving policy. The journal is edited by Yuval Avnur, Peter French, and Howard Wettstein and published by the Philosophy Documentation Center.

Indexing

Midwest Studies in Philosophy is abstracted and indexed in the following bibliographic databases:

See also 
 List of philosophy journals

References 

Philosophy journals
Publications established in 1976
Wiley-Blackwell academic journals
Philosophy Documentation Center academic journals